Laton  is a census-designated place (CDP) in Fresno County, California, United States. The population was 1,824 at the 2010 census, up from 1,236 at the 2000 census.

Geography

History
Laton's first post office opened in 1900, having been transferred from Lillis. The name honors Charles A. Laton, who owned the Rancho Laguna de Tache Mexican land grant.

Demographics

2010
The 2010 United States Census reported that Laton had a population of 1,824. The racial makeup of Laton was 1,001 (54.9%) White, 4 (0.2%) African American, 13 (0.7%) Native American, 10 (0.5%) Asian, 0 (0.0%) Pacific Islander, 744 (40.8%) from other races, and 52 (2.9%) from two or more races. Hispanic or Latino of any race were 1,393 persons (76.4%).

The Census reported that 1,824 people (100% of the population) lived in households, 0 (0%) lived in non-institutionalized group quarters, and 0 (0%) were institutionalized.

Population in 2010: 1,824. Population change since 2000: +47.6%
Males: 950 	 (52.1%)
Females: 874 	 (47.9%)

Median resident age: 	 29.4 years
California median age: 	 45.6 years

There were 474 households, out of which 254 (53.6%) had children under the age of 18 living in them, 284 (59.9%) were opposite-sex married couples living together, 86 (18.1%) had a female householder with no husband present, 33 (7.0%) had a male householder with no wife present.  There were 20 (4.2%) unmarried opposite-sex partnerships, and 9 (1.9%) same-sex married couples or partnerships. 59 households (12.4%) were made up of individuals, and 34 (7.2%) had someone living alone who was 65 years of age or older. The average household size was 3.85.  There were 403 families (85.0% of all households); the average family size was 4.12.

The population was spread out, with 584 people (32.0%) under the age of 18, 211 people (11.6%) aged 18 to 24, 488 people (26.8%) aged 25 to 44, 380 people (20.8%) aged 45 to 64, and 161 people (8.8%) who were 65 years of age or older.  The median age was 29.4 years. For every 100 females, there were 108.7 males.  For every 100 females age 18 and over, there were 107.7 males.

Estimated median household income in 2009: $54,118 (it was $35,408 in 2000)
Laton:	$54,118
California:	$58,931
Estimated per capita income in 2009: $16,759

Hispanic - 1,393 (76.4%)
White alone - 409 (22.4%)
Two or more races - 9 (0.5%)
American Indian alone - 5 (0.3%)
Black alone - 3 (0.2%)
Asian alone - 4 (0.2%)
Other race alone - 1 (0.05%)

Number of households with income < $10k:
Laton:	4.1% (12)
State:	5.7% (695,403)
Number of households with income $10–20k:
Laton:	0.0% (0)
State:	10.1% (1,232,937)
Number of households with income $20–30k:
Laton:	19.4% (56)
State:	9.7% (1,186,065)
Number of households with income $30–40k:
Laton:	4.9% (14)
State:	9.1% (1,108,669)
Number of households with income $40–50k:
Laton:	20.9% (60)
State:	8.5% (1,039,666)
Number of households with income $50–60k:
Laton:	6.9% (20)
State:	7.8% (948,345)
Number of households with income $60–75k:
Laton:	18.1% (52)
California:	9.9% (1,206,377)
Number of households with income $75–100k:
Laton:	10.9% (31)
California:	12.7% (1,547,756)
Number of households with income $100–125k:
Laton:	5.3% (15)
State:	8.9% (1,085,712)
Number of households with income $125–150k:
Laton:	7.5% (22)
State:	5.7% (693,943)
Number of households with income $150–200k:
Laton:	2.1% (6)
State:	6.1% (748,264)
Number of households with income > $200k:
Laton:	0.0% (0)
State:	5.9% (721,754)

Estimated median house or condo value in 2009: $153,079 (it was $78,600 in 2000)
Laton:	$153,079
California:	$384,200
Mean prices in 2009: All housing units: $212,839; Detached houses: $213,299; Mobile homes: $195,202

The homeowner vacancy rate was 1.4%; the rental vacancy rate was 2.6%.  1,017 people (55.8% of the population) lived in owner-occupied housing units and 807 people (44.2%) lived in rental housing units.

2000
As of the census of 2000, there were 1,236 people, 331 households, and 285 families residing in the CDP. The racial makeup of the CDP was 45.15% White, 0.40% Black or African American, 1.13% Native American, 0.65% Asian, 0.08% Pacific Islander, 49.03% from other races, and 3.56% from two or more races.  68.85% of the population were Hispanic or Latino of any race.

There were 331 households, out of which 49.8% had children under the age of 18 living with them, 64.7% were married couples living together, 15.1% had a female householder with no husband present, and 13.6% were non-families. 10.0% of all households were made up of individuals, and 4.8% had someone living alone who was 65 years of age or older.  The average household size was 3.72 and the average family size was 3.96.

In the CDP, the population was spread out, with 35.9% under the age of 18, 11.7% from 18 to 24, 27.3% from 25 to 44, 18.1% from 45 to 64, and 7.0% who were 65 years of age or older.  The median age was 27 years. For every 100 females, there were 100.0 males.  For every 100 females age 18 and over, there were 98.5 males.

The median income for a household in the CDP was $35,408, and the median income for a family was $34,688. Males had a median income of $25,125 versus $25,417 for females. The per capita income for the CDP was $9,702.  About 14.4% of families and 17.4% of the population were below the poverty line, including 19.7% of those under age 18 and 19.7% of those age 65 or over.

References

Census-designated places in Fresno County, California
Populated places established in 1900
Census-designated places in California